Tuten is a surname. Notable people with the surname include:

Aud Tuten (1914–1994), American-born Canadian ice hockey player
Frederic Tuten (born 1936), American novelist, short story writer and essayist
J. Russell Tuten (1911–1968), American politician
Melvin Tuten (born 1971), American football player
Rick Tuten (1965–2017), American football player